Operation Uric (or Operation Bootlace for the South Africans) was a cross-border raid carried out in Mozambique by operatives of the Rhodesian Security Forces during the Rhodesian Bush War, with combat assistance from the South African Air Force. During the operation, which took place from 1 to 7 September 1979, up to 200 Rhodesian and South African military personnel attacked bridges and a major staging point for Zimbabwe African National Liberation Army (ZANLA) insurgents in Gaza Province. Along with Operation Miracle, this was one of the largest Rhodesian external operations of the war.

Targets
During the Rhodesian Bush War (or Second Chimurenga) the Rhodesian Security Forces (RSF) had to deal with an increasing flow of externally trained insurgents coming into Rhodesia, latterly Zimbabwe Rhodesia, from its neighbouring countries, especially from Zambia and Mozambique, the latter in particular after its independence in 1975.

The objectives of Operation Uric were to attack the ZANLA forces in their command and training centre before they could enter Zimbabwe-Rhodesia and to cut off supply routes into the Gaza Province of Mozambique. It was also hoped that the destruction of communication and railway lines, roads and bridges as far as 200 miles into Mozambique would affect the economic situation and the morale of those who supported ZANLA and Robert Mugabe.

Targets were the bridges at Aldeia Da Barragem along with a vital irrigation canal feeding a major agricultural area in Mozambique. Air strikes were planned on FRELIMO installations in Mapai and Maxaila to demoralise the occupants. Afterwards the base at Mapai would be taken and destroyed by Zimbabwe-Rhodesian ground forces.

Attack

Prior to the attack, 200 Zimbabwe Rhodesian troops had been deployed into an area  inside of Mozambique east-southeast of Chigubu. Helicopters were at Chipinda Pools airstrip within Zimbabwe Rhodesia. The attack only began on 5 September because of bad weather conditions. Rhodesian SAS troops were airlifted to Aldeia De Barragem and four other targets to destroy bridges and infrastructure. Hawker Hunter jets and Cessna Lynx aircraft bombed the area and provided air support. During evacuation of a wounded soldier one AB-205A helicopter was shot down by a RPG-7 with the technician, LAC AJC Wesson killed on impact. The pilot Flt Lt Dick Paxton was rescued by the SAS.

On 6 September the ZANLA base at Mapai was bombarded by Hawker Hunters destroying the command centre and the main radar station. Afterwards the Zimbabwe-Rhodesian troops were transported by helicopter to attack positions near the base. During transport operations a South African Puma helicopter was hit by an RPG-7 at  killing all 14 Zimbabwe-Rhodesian commandos and the three South African Air Force crew on board. This was the highest loss of life for the Rhodesian Security Forces in a single incident during the war. The crash site was later bombed in an attempt to cover the South African markings on the Puma helicopter. The bodies were never recovered. The Mapai base was fortified by interconnecting zig-zag trenches which provided good cover for the defenders. Heavy fighting took place between the Rhodesian Army and FPLM soldiers. Mapai was repeatedly bombarded by Hunter jets and Canberra bombers. Shortly before sundown the decision to withdraw was taken by the Supreme Commander of the Rhodesian Army General Walls.

Aftermath
The battle resulted in over 300 dead ZANLA soldiers and a number of damaged bridges, buildings and infrastructure. Mozambican casualties were 22 killed and 32 wounded.  Zimbabwe Rhodesian casualties were 17 killed, which amounted to a disaster for the Rhodesian forces, despite a kill-ratio of over 20:1. It became obvious to the Rhodesian Security Forces that their enemy would soon become a more legitimate fighting force than before, who were trained by their Soviet advisers, and who were now, through experience, standing their ground through air attacks unlike earlier in the war. Zimbabwe Rhodesian soldiers were well trained, motivated, and equipped, but international sanctions such as United Nations Security Council Resolution 232, and isolation had led to increased problems in replacing mostly aircraft, while arms and ammo were mostly plentiful in stocks.

Politically the operation led to Samora Machel putting pressure on Robert Mugabe to take part in the Lancaster House peace talks. Machel wanted to prevent Mozambique from being dragged further into the war with Zimbabwe Rhodesia, which had already seriously damaged its economy.

References

Bibliography

External links
Operation Uric at www.rhodesia.nl
Operation Uric at www.rhodesianforces.org
The Search for a PUMA Helicopter Lost at Mapai, 6 September 1979

1979 in Mozambique
1979 in Rhodesia
1979 in South Africa
Battles and operations of the Rhodesian Bush War
Military operations of the Rhodesian Bush War involving South Africa
Mozambique–Rhodesia relations
September 1979 events in Africa